Alice Carpanese (born 19 November 1987) was an Italian swimmer who competed in the 2008 Summer Olympics in Beijing.

References

1987 births
Living people
Italian female swimmers
Italian female freestyle swimmers
Olympic swimmers of Italy
Swimmers at the 2008 Summer Olympics
European Aquatics Championships medalists in swimming
Universiade medalists in swimming
Mediterranean Games bronze medalists for Italy
Mediterranean Games medalists in swimming
Swimmers at the 2005 Mediterranean Games
Universiade bronze medalists for Italy
Medalists at the 2007 Summer Universiade
20th-century Italian women
21st-century Italian women